John Phelps George (26 April 188226 November 1962) was a British athlete. He competed at the 1908 Summer Olympics in London. He was born in Croydon and died in Purley, London.

George won the second heat of the 100 metres with a time of 11 3⁄5 seconds, advancing to the semifinals.  In the fourth semifinal, George placed last to drop out of further contention.

He also won his heat of the 200 metres, advancing to the semifinals with a time of 23.4 seconds.  His third-place finish in his semifinal race kept him from advancing in that event as well.

References

Sources
 profile
 
 
 

1882 births
1962 deaths
British male sprinters
Olympic athletes of Great Britain
Athletes (track and field) at the 1908 Summer Olympics
20th-century British people